Hüseyin Beşok (born 8 February 1975) is a retired Turkish professional basketball player. Standing at 2.11 m (6 ft 11 in) in height and 120 kg (265 lbs) in weight, he used to play as center.

Professional career
A solid big man, he played for Pınar Karşıyaka at the youth and senior level before transferring to Efes Pilsen, where he spent several seasons.

He also played for Maccabi Tel Aviv in Israel, Šibenik in Croatia, Asvel in France, shortly for UNICS Kazan in Russia, Le Mans in France and Prokom in Poland in the 2006–07 season start.

He was the highest paid athlete in Polish club sport history (including soccer, volleyball, etc.) with a yearly fee of US$700,000.

He used to be a regular member of the Turkish national basketball team.

Honours

Club honours

 Korać Cup: 1996
Turkish Basketball League (2): 1996, 1997
Turkish Cup (3): 1996, 1998, 2001
Turkish President's Cup: 2000
 2x Turkish Basketball All-Star Game (2008, 2009)
Israeli Premier League (2): 2002, 2003
Israeli State Cup (2): 2002, 2003
LNB Pro A: 2006
Polish Basketball League: 2007

Individual awards
LNB All Star Game (2): 2005, 2006
LNB Pro A Finals MVP: 2006

References

External links
Euroleague.net Profile
TBLStat.net Profile
Profile at tbl.org.tr

1975 births
Living people
ABA League players
Aliağa Petkim basketball players
Anadolu Efes S.K. players
ASVEL Basket players
Beşiktaş men's basketball players
Centers (basketball)
Galatasaray S.K. (men's basketball) players
Hacettepe Üniversitesi B.K. players
Israeli Basketball Premier League players
Karşıyaka basketball players
KK Šibenik players
Le Mans Sarthe Basket players
Maccabi Tel Aviv B.C. players
Asseco Gdynia players
Sportspeople from İzmir
Turkish people of Bosniak descent
Turkish men's basketball players
Turkish expatriate basketball people in France
Turkish expatriate basketball people in Russia
Turkish expatriate basketball people in Croatia
Turkish expatriate basketball people in Israel
Turkish expatriate basketball people in Poland
Türk Telekom B.K. players
2002 FIBA World Championship players